Easton is a village in Hampshire, England, situated on the River Itchen, 2¾ miles north east of Winchester.  It is in the civil parish of Itchen Valley.

In 1870–72, John Goring's Imperial Gazetteer of England and Wales described Easton like this:

"EASTON, a village and a parish in Winchester district, Hants. The village stands on the river Itchen, near the Southwestern railway, 2¾ miles NE by N of Winchester; is small and uninteresting; and has a post office under Winchester. The parish comprises 2,734 acres [11 km²]. Real property, £3, 656. Pop., 455. Houses, 106. The property is much subdivided. The living is a rectory in the diocese of Winchester. Value, £514.* Patron, the Bishop of Winchester. The church is late Norman; has a rich south doorway, and an apsidal vaulted chancel; contains a monument to Bishop Barlow's widow, recording that her five daughters were all married to bishops; and was restored in 1850. There is a Wesleyan chapel."

In 2010 Easton remains a small village but underwent limited development during the inter and post-war period. The population has grown by about 300 since John Goring's time. Around ten additional houses have been built since 2000, and the land price has rocketed, although planning restrictions are very strict. The church mentioned in the above passage still stands and operates. There are two pubs in the village (The Chestnut Horse and The Cricketers Inn), a small auto-garage and a village hall. The hall performs various functions including crèche services, WI meetings, a pavilion for the village cricket team and is the venue for an annual pantomime. The hall has just been rebuilt, after a 5-year fund-raising drive by villagers.

Governance
The village is part of the civil parish of Itchen Valley and is part of the City of Winchester non-metropolitan district of Hampshire County Council.

References

External links

Easton